Dublin South may refer to:

South Dublin county
Dublin South (Dáil constituency) (1981–2016)
Dublin City South (Dáil constituency) (1921–1948)
South Dublin (UK Parliament constituency) (1885–1922)